The 2014–15 Sacred Heart Pioneers men's basketball team represented Sacred Heart University during the 2014–15 NCAA Division I men's basketball season. This was the Pioneers' 16th season of NCAA Division I basketball, all played in the Northeast Conference. The Pioneers were led by second year head coach Anthony Latina and played their home games at the William H. Pitt Center. They finished the season 15–17, 9–9 in NEC play to finish in a tie for fifth place. They lost in the quarterfinals of the NEC tournament to Bryant.

Roster

Schedule

|-
!colspan=9 style="background:#990000; color:#999999;"| Regular season

|-
!colspan=9 style="background:#990000; color:#999999;"| NEC tournament

References 

Sacred Heart Pioneers men's basketball seasons
Sacred Heart
Sacred Heart Pioneers men's b
Sacred Heart Pioneers men's b